Scocco is an Italian surname. Notable people with the surname include:

Ignacio Scocco (born 1985), Argentine footballer 
Mauro Scocco (born 1962), Swedish pop artist of Italian descent

Italian-language surnames